is a song by the Jpop vocalist Hironobu Kageyama and was used as the opening theme for the anime OAV based on the 1987 Ninja Turtles series Mutant Turtles: Superman Legend. It was written by Yukinojo Mori and composed by Takashi Ike. It was released by Columbia Records on March 3, 1996 in Japan only and is coupled with the series closing theme "Chikyū wa Ogenki" performed by "Mokkun". The song would also go on to be featured in Kageyama's five disc anthology boxset "Eternity".

Track list

External links
"Kageyama Complete!" listing

1996 singles
Teenage Mutant Ninja Turtles music
1996 songs
Songs written by Yukinojo Mori